The Aero-X hoverbike is an aircraft created by Aerofex, an aerospace engineering corporation based in Los Angeles, designed to carry up to two people. It is not known when it will be released for sale.

Vehicle
Aerofex say that the vehicle rises 10 feet from the ground and can travel at a maximum of 45 miles per hour. It is expected to weigh 785lb and be 15 feet in length. The bike runs for around 75 minutes on a full tank of fuel.

The Aero-X does not fly with the same energy efficiency as a helicopter, due to its rotor blades being shorter, but it is much smaller in size and safer near humans. This craft does not produce the brownout of helicopters, as it is designed to be able to operate near people without blowing any significant amount of dust.

Development
The vehicle has been in development since 2008 and was originally planned for use by one person or as an unmanned drone.

One of the difficulties of this technology involves stability and control, preventing the craft from frequent rollovers and crashes. To achieve this, Aerofex added two control bars which the rider can access at knee level and easily lean to one side or the other to balance the craft.

The price has been given as $85,000.

Planned usages
The planned usages include agricultural field work, delivering materials in rough terrain, and for search and rescue vehicles. In December 2017 Aerofex received a second international patent in Japan.  The Peripheral Control Ejectors (PCE) patented will allow Aerofex unmanned vehicles to spray crops.

See also 
 Roadable aircraft
 Hovercraft
 Hovertrain
 Hoverboard
 Hovercar

References

External links
 

Hovercraft